Vaigai Express is a 2017 Tamil-language thriller film directed by Shaji Kailas and produced by R. K. The film stars R. K. himself and Neetu Chandra, while Ineya essays a supporting role. Beginning production in late 2014, the remake of the Malayalam film Nadiya Kollappetta Rathri, was released across Tamil Nadu on 24 March 2017.

Cast

R. K. as Sharafudeen Rahman IPS
Neetu Chandra as Radhika and Jyothika
Siddique as Kumaraswamy
Ineya as Swapnapriya
Suja Varunee as Madhavi
Komal Sharma as Yamini Chandrasekharan
Swapna Menon as Thulasi Mani
Nassar as Inspector Mayilvaganan
Suman as Minister S. Karikalan
R. K. Selvamani as Ali Ibrahim/James Rodues/Manish Yatra
M. S. Bhaskar as TTR "King" Kesavan
Ramesh Khanna as Ramesh
Manobala as Kannitheevu Kaarmegam / Thavittaisaamy
John Vijay as Railway S.P. Alexander
Pawan as Ajay
Singamuthu as Veerappan
Srinish Aravind as Prakash
Archana Chandhoke as Anuradha
Sriranjini as Karpagavalli
Anoop Chandran as Azhagusundaram
Nandha Saravanan as "Attack" Mani
Chutti Aravind as Balu
Madhan Bob as Paavaadaisaamy
Anu Mohan as Railway Officer
Tamilselvi as Ambika Veerappan

Production
In December 2014, actor-producer R. K. revealed that he would work for a third time with director Shaji Kailas after previous collaborations on Ellam Avan Seyal (2008) and En Vazhi Thani Vazhi (2015), and announced he would finance and star in an action film titled Vaigai Express. An ensemble cast of actresses and supporting actors was announced at a launch held at AVM Studios, Chennai during the same month. Thaman was signed to compose the film's background score, with no separate songs or soundtrack for the film. Neetu Chandra, who plays a double role in the film, suffered an injury on the sets of the film in February 2015. Ineya revealed that she would be portraying an actress and shot for her scenes in March 2015. Director R. K. Selvamani was selected to play the film's chief antagonist. The film was completed in mid-2015 and was subsequently put on hold before promotions began gearing up for release in early 2017.

Release
Vaigai Express was released across Tamil Nadu on 24 March 2017. The Times of India gave the film a negative review and mentioned "in one way, Vaigai Express has done justice to the remake by not rectifying the shoddy graphics work - in fact, the way several scenes have been executed in this film makes one feel that the original version deserves a few awards". Similarly The New Indian Express noted it was a "remake that didn't hit the right chord", with Indiaglitz.com stating "it was a tiring journey". In a slightly more positive review, the Deccan Chronicle stated it was "a film that can be enjoyed only in parts". Competition at the box office meant that Vaigai Express was removed from most screens after a single week.

References

External links
 

2017 films
Indian thriller films
2010s Tamil-language films
Films set on trains
Films scored by Thaman S
2017 thriller films
Tamil remakes of Malayalam films
Films directed by Shaji Kailas